Khalil Arbaji (born 17 August 1947) is a Syrian sports shooter. He competed in the mixed skeet event at the 1980 Summer Olympics, and finished in last place out of 46 competitors, earning 172 points.

References

External links

1947 births
Living people
Syrian male sport shooters
Olympic shooters of Syria
Shooters at the 1980 Summer Olympics
Place of birth missing (living people)